Bălțata is a commune in Criuleni District, Moldova. It is composed of four villages: Bălțata, Bălțata de Sus, Sagaidac and Sagaidacul de Sus.

References

Communes of Criuleni District